Ambia ptolycusalis is a species of moth of the family Crambidae. It is found in  Queensland,  Australia.

The larvae feed on Hydrilla species.

References

Acentropinae
Moths described in 1859
Moths of Australia